Ischnocnema izecksohni is a species of frogs in the family Brachycephalidae. It is endemic to the state of Minas Gerais, Brazil, and known from the Espinhaço and Mantiqueira Mountains. Common name Izecksohn's robber frog has been coined for this species.

Etymology
The specific name izecksohni honours Eugênio Izecksohn, a Brazilian herpetologist.

Description
It is a relatively slender Ischnocnema. The head is as wide as long. The canthus rostralis is distinct. The tympanum is relatively small but distinct. The fingers and toes are slender with apical discs, most of them small. The dorsum is smooth and has minute, scattered tubercles. The upper eyelids are tuberculate.

Habitat and conservation
It also survives in secondary forests. It lives in leaf-litter on the forest floor. It is threatened by habitat loss and degradation caused by logging, disturbance due to tourism, and infrastructure development.

References

izecksohni
Endemic fauna of Brazil
Amphibians of Brazil
Amphibians described in 1989
Taxa named by Ulisses Caramaschi
Taxonomy articles created by Polbot